Canina ('canine' in Latin), may refer to :
 Canina (subtribe), a zoological taxon name (subtribe) belonging to the Canini tribe of the family Canidae (canids); Canina includes the domestic dog, coyote, jackals, Eurasian wild dogs species, and most species named wolves.
 Canina, an Italian surname:
 Luigi Canina (1795–1856), Italian archaeologist and architect
 Any of several cultivars of wine grape:
 Uva Canina, a red Italian wine grape grown through Central Italy but most noted in Tuscany
 Canina, another name for the French wine grape Tourbat
 Canina, another name for the Italian wine grape Drupeggio
 Tillandsia 'Canina', a plant hybrid cultivar

See also
, including use as a species name
 Caninae, one of the three subfamilies in the canid family
 Canine (disambiguation)
 Real Sociedad Canina de España